Szczecińskie Przedsiębiorstwo Autobusowe "Klonowica" (SPAK or SPA Klonowica) – one of four municipal bus transport companies in Szczecin, Poland. The company is owned by city Szczecin. The headquarters is located at the left bank of Odra river, in Zachód District (10 Sebastiana Klonowica Street).

It has been operating as a separate company since 1 November 1999. That day, according to the resolution of Szczecin city council, the company was separated from MZK Szczecin (just like Szczecińskie Przedsiębiorstwo Autobusowe "Dąbie"). On behalf of the Zarząd Dróg i Transportu Miejskiego, the company currently operates following bus lines: 51, 53, 57, 58, 59, 60, 63, 67, 68, 69, 70, 74, 75, 76, 78, 80, 82, 83, 86, 87, 88 (daytime lines), B (fast line), and night lines 521, 525, 527, 528, 529.

The current chairman is Krzysztof Putiatycki.

Vehicles

External links 
 Official website of the company
 Public transport Szczecin

Sources
 Official website of the company

Transport in Szczecin